Kibramoa madrona is a species of true spider in the family Plectreuridae. It is found in the United States.

References

Plectreuridae
Articles created by Qbugbot
Spiders described in 1958